Sunday Island is one of several uninhabited Canadian arctic islands in Nunavut, Canada located within James Bay. Nearby are the Bear Islands.

The island is surveyed for polar bear summer refuge.

References

Islands of James Bay
Uninhabited islands of Qikiqtaaluk Region